Mount Mansfield State Forest covers  in seven towns in Chittenden, Lamoille and Washington counties in Vermont. The towns are Bolton and Underhill in Chittenden County, Cambridge, Johnson, Morristown and Stowe in Lamoille County, and Waterbury in Washington County. Mt. Mansfield State Forest is the largest contiguous landholding owned by the Vermont Department of Forests, Parks and Recreation.

Recreation
There are four state parks located in the forest: Little River State Park, Smugglers' Notch State Park, Underhill State Park and Waterbury Center State Park. Activities include camping, swimming, boating, fishing, hiking, picnicking, bicycling, wildlife watching, and winter sports.

The alpine ski resorts of Smugglers' Notch and Stowe Mountain Resort are located in the forest. There are two Nordic ski centers – Mt. Mansfield Touring Center and Bolton Nordic Center at Bolton Valley. The Catamount Trail Association manages backcountry ski trails in the Forest. There are over 36 miles of VAST snowmobile trails throughout the Forest and mountain biking trails in the southern end.

There are numerous miles of hiking trails that include the Long Trail and hikes up and around Mount Mansfield.

The 880-acre Waterbury Reservoir features three motorboat access points and one car-top boat access point. There are remote campsites along the shores of the Reservoir that are being developed as the Department partners with the Friends of Waterbury Reservoir. Primitive camping is allowed on various portions of Mt. Mansfield State Forest, following the developed guidelines.

Hunting, fishing and trapping are allowed throughout the Forest.

Features
Mt. Mansfield State Forest features and is named for Mount Mansfield, the highest peak in Vermont at 4,393-feet. The 400-acre summit ridge is actually owned by the University of Vermont.

The forest contains two State Natural Areas - Daniels Notch Natural Area and Mt. Mansfield Natural Area.

Smugglers' Notch Proper is listed as a National Natural Landmark.

Vermont Route 108 between Stowe Mountain Resort and Smugglers' Notch Resort is a federally designated Scenic By-way.

References

External links
Official website

Vermont state forests
Protected areas of Chittenden County, Vermont
Protected areas of Lamoille County, Vermont
Protected areas of Washington County, Vermont
Bolton, Vermont
Underhill, Vermont
Cambridge, Vermont
Johnson, Vermont
Morristown, Vermont
Stowe, Vermont
Waterbury, Vermont